Celebrity Page (formerly OK!TV, that is based on the magazine of the same name) is an American syndicated entertainment news program.  The series is co-produced with Dotdash Meredith (formerly OK! US parent company American Media), Unconventional Partners, and Trifecta Entertainment & Media. The series premiered on September 9, 2013. It is also broadcast several times daily on the cable network Reelz, which is a production partner in the program.

On March 15, 2016, Trifecta announced that the series would be renamed Celebrity Page as a result of changing its partnership from American Media's OK! magazine to Meredith Corporation, which returned to producing content for syndication ten months after the Better Show was canceled. The change took effect on March 28, 2016.

Details
The series focuses on pop culture, celebrity news, gossip and lifestyle stories, some sourced formerly through Meredith's television stations (which went to Gray Television in 2021) and magazine resources (though not those of the former Time Inc., including People and Entertainment Weekly; Meredith completed their purchase of Time Inc. in January 2018, but those magazines have their own platforms and content agreements), along with Soap Opera Digest. The program is co-hosted by Sonia Isabelle in New York and Jaymes Vaughan in Los Angeles.

References

2010s American television news shows
2013 American television series debuts
American television series based on British television series
First-run syndicated television programs in the United States
English-language television shows
Entertainment news shows in the United States
Infotainment
Meredith Corporation
Reelz original programming